Guardiola thompsonii is a rare North American species of plants in the family Asteraceae. It is found only in western Mexico in the state of Michoacán.

One plant will produce 15-20 flower heads in a flat-topped array per major branch. Each head contains 2-3 ray flowers and 10-15 disc flowers.

References

thompsonii
Flora of Michoacán
Plants described in 1976